The Minister for the Environment, Climate and Communications is a senior minister in the Government of Ireland and leads the Department of the Environment, Climate and Communications.

The current Minister for the Environment, Climate and Communications is Eamon Ryan, TD. He is also Minister for Transport. 

He is assisted by two Ministers of State:
Jack Chambers, TD – Minister of State for Postal Policy.
Ossian Smyth, TD – Minister of State for Communications and the Circular economy

Overview
The department has responsibilities in the areas of:

Energy
 To develop a competitive energy supply industry
 To ensure security and reliability of energy supply
 To develop energy conservation and end-use efficiency.

Communications
 Communications development – promotion of the provision and development of competitive high quality and world class services in the communications, electronic and mobile commerce sectors. 
 Business and technology – focusing on new business and technology applications and the development of policies, initiatives and legislation as appropriate.
 Regulatory affairs – the development of effective policies for the regulation of the electronic communications sector and management of the radio frequency spectrum. 
 Postal services – the development of an effective policy for the Irish postal sector based on open market principles.
 It is seen as a successor to the old Department of Posts and Telegraphs.

Natural Resources
 The Petroleum Affairs Division aims to: 
 maximise the benefits to the State from exploration for and production of indigenous oil and gas resources;
 ensure that activities are conducted safely and with due regard to their impact on the environment and other land/sea users.
 The Exploration and Mining Division of the Department is charged with:
 applying the Minerals Development Act to minerals exploration and development; 
 encouraging the early identification and responsible development by private investors of the Nation's minerals deposits in accordance with best international practice; 
 enhancing the attractiveness of Ireland for international and national minerals investment by active promotional measures. 
 The Geological Survey of Ireland is:
 Ireland's National Earth Science Agency, and is responsible for providing geological advice and information.

List of office-holders

Notes

See also
Minister for Posts and Telegraphs (responsible for Communications until 1984; Minister for Communications, from 1984 to 1991)
Minister for Housing, Local Government and Heritage (responsible for the Environment until 2016)
Irish Land Commission

References

External links
Department of the Environment, Climate and Communications

Government ministers of the Republic of Ireland
Lists of government ministers of Ireland
Communications in the Republic of Ireland
Energy in the Republic of Ireland
Telecommunications in the Republic of Ireland
Ministries established in 1921
Ireland
Ireland
Minister
Environment of the Republic of Ireland